Xuxa Park was a Brazilian children's television series hosted by Xuxa Meneghel, based on the Xou da Xuxa, produced by Michael Jay Solomon and screened from March 12 to June 18, 1992 by the Madrid network Telecinco, the third largest broadcaster of Spain in audience, totaling 15 episodes. The show worked with several blocks, where in each block a game is presented, counting on the participation of the Paquitas and the character Topo Gigio, a cartoon doll of a mouse that was very popular in the 1960s in Brazil and in the world.

Background 
Xuxa became a household name throughout Latin America thanks to its children's television program El Show de Xuxa produced in Argentina during the years 1991 and 1993, and aired in 17 Latin American countries 
and United States by Univision, with an estimated audience of 25 million viewers.

She caught the attention of the Spanish public ever since starring on two TV shows on Telecinco a year earlier in 1991, and the annual releases of her international albums, as well as song, that had become popular there.

Development 
Xuxa Park was filmed in Barcelona, on a soundstage replicating an amusement park, in a similar fashion to Xou da Xuxa. The guests were usually singers, circus performers, and Spanish comic groups, as well as the presentation of games. The novelty in relation to Brazilian version, was that parents and children could compete in the games in teams, formed by two children and two adults.

Release 
"Xuxa Park" was released in 1992, and was aired weekly on Sundays, totaling 15 episodes, each with an hour and-a-half during the spring schedule of Telecinco, Madrid's station with national reach, which holds 50% of the Spanish audience - which places second place after of the La 1. Before the launch of the show, a Press conference was organized by the issuer to present formally Xuxa and Paquitas to the public.

Reception and ratings
Four months after the debut of Xuxa Park in Tele 5, the direction of the station expressed interest in renewing the contract for another five months with the host for a second season of the show, but the negotiations have not advanced due to busy schedule of Xuxa, and recordings of their TV show in the United States —Xuxa—that would be released early next year in North America.

"Xuxa Park" conquered high ratings: 45 points (an estimated audience of 25 million people).

See also 
 El Show de Xuxa
 Xuxa Park (Brazilian TV series)

References

External links
 Xuxa Park (Spain) (in Portuguese) in the Xuxa.com

Spanish game shows
1990s Spanish television series
Spanish children's television series
Xuxa
1992 Spanish television series debuts
1992 Spanish television series endings
Spanish-language television shows
Telecinco original programming